Ezeh Chisom Faith (born 10 November 1994), professionally known as Rexxie, is a Nigerian record producer, DJ, and songwriter. He is popular for creating the Zanku sound, and producing Naira Marley's Soapy, Tesumole and the song KPK with MohBad.

Early life and career
Rexxie was born in Lagos, Nigeria. Rexxie had his basic education in Abuja and Lagos where he was raised, he attended Yaba College of Technology and graduated from the Tai Solarin University of Education.

Rexxie produced songs like Comma and Bebo on the Grammy-winning album Twice As Tall by Burna Boy.

Rexxie has produced Nigerian music for the likes of Zlatan, Naira Marley, Davido, and Burna Boy.

Rexxie released studio album  A True Champion on June 28, 2021, which fearured artists like Zlatan Ibile, Davido, Naira Marley, Zinoleesky, Mohbad, Sarkodie, Peruzzi.

Production discography

Singles produced

Studio albums and EP
AfroStreet The EP (2020)

A True Champion (2021)

Nataraja (2021)

Awards and nominations

References

Living people
Nigerian hip hop record producers
Nigerian songwriters
1994 births